Judiciary of Korea may refer to
 Judiciary of South Korea, the modern judicial branch of Government of South Korea with two supreme courts.
 Judiciary of North Korea, the modern judicial branch of Government of North Korea with one supreme court.